Ego is a 2018 Indian Telugu-language drama film written and directed by R.V. Subramanyam. It stars Aashish Raj Bidkikar and Simran Sharma.

Cast

Aashish Raj Bidkikar as Gopi
Simran Sharma as Indu
Prudhvi Raj as CI Aavugadda Apparao
Posani Krishna Murali as Police Inspector Satyanarayan
Ajay as DCP
Diksha Panth
Rao Ramesh as Soundarajan
Snigda
Chammak Chandra as Jeeva
Gautam Raju 
Shakalaka Shankar  as Shankar 
Kyra Dutt...Special appearance in song "O Naatu Kurroda"

Soundtrack

Reviews

123telugu.com gave 2.25 out of 5 stars stating, "Ego is a disappointing romantic drama which does not have any depth in the proceedings". The Hans India gave 2.75 stars stating, "The movie is good in parts and could have been much better than what it was now".

References

External links 
 

2010s Telugu-language films
2018 masala films

Films scored by Sai Karthik